Nikola Kalabić (born 25 October 1978) is a Serbian swimmer. He competed at the 1996 Summer Olympics and the 2000 Summer Olympics.

References

1978 births
Living people
Serbian male swimmers
Olympic swimmers of Yugoslavia
Swimmers at the 1996 Summer Olympics
Swimmers at the 2000 Summer Olympics
Place of birth missing (living people)